The 1994–95 season was the 84th season in Hajduk Split’s history and their fourth in the Prva HNL. Their 1st place finish in the 1993–94 season meant it was their 4th successive season playing in the Prva HNL.

Competitions

Overall record

Prva HNL

Classification

Results summary

Results by round

Results by opponent

Source: 1994–95 Croatian First Football League article

UEFA Champions League

Group C

Matches

Croatian Football Super Cup

Source: hajduk.hr

Prva HNL

Source: hajduk.hr

Croatian Football Cup

Source: hajduk.hr

Champions League

Source: hajduk.hr

Player seasonal records

Top scorers

Source: Competitive matches

See also
1994–95 Croatian First Football League
1994–95 Croatian Football Cup

References

External sources
 1994–95 Prva HNL at HRnogomet.com
 1994–95 Croatian Cup at HRnogomet.com
 1994–95 UEFA Champions League at rsssf.com

HNK Hajduk Split seasons
Hajduk Split
Croatian football championship-winning seasons